Duboki Potok is a village in the municipality of Ilijaš, Bosnia and Herzegovina.

Demographics 
According to the 2013 census, its population was 2, both Croats.

References

Populated places in Ilijaš